Alfred Huet du Pavillon (January 1829, in Blain, Loire-Atlantique – 1907, in Frohsdorf) was a French botanist. His brother, Édouard Huet du Pavillon (1819-1908), with whom he often collaborated, was also a botanist.

He spent his childhood in Switzerland, later studying under botanist Alphonse de Candolle. From 1852 to 1856 he was curator of de Candolle's herbarium. In the 1850s he took a series of botanical expeditions to the Pyrénées, Armenia, Italy (including Sicily) and Sardinia. In Italy and Sicily, he was accompanied by Édouard Huet du Pavillon.

With his brother, he amassed an impressive herbarium, and issued numerous series of exsiccatae. In 1856 Pierre Edmond Boissier introduced the genus name Huetia in honor of the Huet brothers.

Associated writings 
 Description de quelques plantes nouvelles des Pyrénées, 1853 - Description of some new plants of the Pyrénées.
 Notice biographique sur les botanistes Edouard et Alfred Huet du Pavillon, 1914, Edouard Huet du Pavillon, Alfred Huet du Pavillon, John Briquet.

References 

1829 births
1907 deaths
People from Loire-Atlantique
19th-century French botanists